Ebben is a Dutch originating in the region around Nijmegen. The given name Ebbe can be a short form of Egbert or "Eber-" names like Eberhard. People with this name include:

Anton Ebben (1930–2011), Dutch equestrian
Bill Ebben (born 1941), American basketball player
Debbe Ebben (born 1988), American beauty pageant
Gary L. Ebben (born c. 1961), United States Air Force brigadier general

See also
 Ebbers, surname of the same origin

References

Dutch-language surnames
Patronymic surnames